Gălești is a commune in Strășeni District, Moldova. It is composed of two villages, Gălești and Găleștii Noi.

References

Communes of Strășeni District